Kathleen Kiernan  is a Demographer. She is Emeritus Professor of Social Policy and Demography at the University of York. Kiernan joined the university in October 2004 from her previous role as Professor of Social Policy and Demography at the London School of Economics. She was awarded an OBE for services to Social Science in the 2006 New Year Honours and was elected as a fellow of the British Academy in 2012.

References

Living people
Fellows of the British Academy
Officers of the Order of the British Empire
Year of birth missing (living people)
Academics of the University of York
Women social scientists